Juan Carlos Maldonado (born 7 September 1986) is an Argentine former footballer. His last professional club was then Primera B club Deportes La Serena.

External links
 Profile at Personal Webpage
 

1986 births
Living people
Argentine footballers
Argentine expatriate footballers
Club Deportivo Palestino footballers
Coquimbo Unido footballers
Deportes La Serena footballers
C.D. Antofagasta footballers
Oriente Petrolero players
Club Atlético Belgrano footballers
Primera B de Chile players
Chilean Primera División players
Argentine Primera División players
Expatriate footballers in Chile
Expatriate footballers in Bolivia
Association football midfielders
Instituto footballers
Sportspeople from Córdoba Province, Argentina